Arrigo Barnabé (born September 14, 1951) is a Brazilian musician and actor. His best-known record is perhaps the critically acclaimed Clara Crocodilo.

Barnabé was born in Londrina, Paraná, Brazil. His music is best known for having a heavily experimental approach, in which the author uses dodecaphonism and atonalism as main principles of composition. He also has written soundtracks for several Brazilian movies.

He hosts a radio show called Supertônicas at Rádio Cultura in São Paulo.

Arrigo Barnabé is cited in the songs "Língua" by Caetano Veloso and "Eu Quero Saber Quem Matou" by Rogério Skylab.

He has a younger brother, Paulo Barnabé, also a musician and member of the experimental band Patife Band.

Discography 
1980 - Clara Crocodilo
1984 - Tubarões Voadores
1986 - Cidade Oculta (movie soundtrack)
1987 - Suspeito
1992 - Façanhas
1997 - Ed Mort (movie soundtrack)
1998 - Gigante Negão
1999 - A Saga de Clara Crocodilo
2004 - Coletânea 25 Anos de Clara Crocodilo (Includes: Clara Crocodilo, Tubarões Voadores, Gigante Negão, A Saga de Clara Crocodilo and Uma Suíte a Quatro Mãos)
2004 - Missa in Memorian Arthur Bispo do Rosário
2007 - Missa in Memorian Itamar Assumpção

Filmography 
1981 - O Olho Mágico do Amor
1986 - Cidade Oculta
1986 - Nem Tudo É Verdade— playing the role of Orson Welles
1987 - Anjos da Noite
2002 - Desmundo
2012 - Luz nas Trevas

See also
 Vânia Bastos
 Itamar Assumpção
 Vanguarda Paulista

References

1951 births
Living people
20th-century Brazilian male singers
20th-century Brazilian singers
Brazilian experimental musicians
People from Londrina
Twelve-tone and serial composers
Vanguarda Paulistana
Male classical composers
21st-century Brazilian male singers
21st-century Brazilian singers